The CONCACAF Central American Zone of the CONCACAF zone of the 2002 FIFA World Cup qualification was contested between 6 teams from the Central America zone. The teams were divided into 2 groups of 3 teams each. The teams played against each other on a home-and-away basis. The group winners advanced to the Semi-final round. The runners-up advanced to the Play-offs.

Group A

The matches between Belize and Guatemala were played on neutral ground due to a border dispute.

Group B

References

External links
 FIFA.com

1
2000 in Central American football
1999–2000 in Honduran football
1999–2000 in Salvadoran football
1999–2000 in Guatemalan football
1999–2000 in Belizean football
1999–2000 in Nicaraguan football

de:Fußball-Weltmeisterschaft 2002/Qualifikation#CONCACAF Vorrunde
fr:Tours préliminaires à la Coupe du monde de football 2002#Caraïbes - Groupe 1
ko:2002년 FIFA 월드컵 북아메리카 지역 예선#카리브해
nl:Wereldkampioenschap voetbal 2002 (kwalificatie CONCACAF)#Caribische zone
pt:Eliminatórias da Copa do Mundo FIFA de 2002 - América do Norte, Central e Caribe#Zona Caribenha
ru:Чемпионат мира по футболу 2002 (отборочный турнир, КОНКАКАФ)#Карибская зона